Riccardo Bellotti (born 5 August 1991) is a former Italian tennis player.

Bellotti has a career high ATP singles ranking of 199 achieved on 8 May 2017. He also has a career high ATP doubles ranking of 514 achieved on 10 December 2012.

Belotti won a record tying nine ITF titles in 2016.

Bellotti made his ATP main draw debut at the 2017 Istanbul Open after defeating Andrés Molteni and Laurynas Grigelis in qualifying. He was defeated by Rogério Dutra Silva in the first round.

Challenger and Futures Finals

Singles: 39 (30–9)

Doubles: 13 (3–10)

References

External links

1991 births
Living people
Italian male tennis players
Tennis players from Vienna
21st-century Italian people